This is a list of Category A listed buildings in Shetland, Scotland.

In Scotland, the term listed building refers to a building or other structure officially designated as being of "special architectural or historic interest".  Category A structures are those considered to be buildings of "national or international importance, either architecturally or historically". Listing was begun by a provision in the Town and Country Planning (Scotland) Act 1947, and the current legislative basis for listing is the Planning (Listed Buildings and Conservation Areas) (Scotland) Act 1997.  The authority for listing rests with Historic Environment Scotland, an executive agency of the Scottish Government, which inherited this role from the Scottish Development Department in 1991. Once listed, severe restrictions are imposed on the modifications allowed to a building's structure or its fittings. Listed building consent must be obtained from local authorities prior to any alteration to such a structure. There are approximately 47,000 listed buildings in Scotland, of which around 8 percent (some 3,800) are Category A.

The council area of Shetland comprises an archipelago of around 100 islands, including 15 inhabited islands with a total population of around 20,000. There are 11 Category A listed buildings on the islands, representing a range of building dates and types. Two lighthouses merit Category A listing: Sumburgh Head Lighthouse is described as "one of Scotland's finest surviving pieces of early 19th century architecture"; while the Muckle Flugga Lighthouse is Britain's most northerly building. Other functional buildings include the grain mill at Quendale, and the waterfront warehouses at The Lodberrie in Lerwick, said to be "the most photographed building in Shetland." There are a number of haas, or laird's houses, of the 17th and 18th centuries. The 17th-century Fort Charlotte was burnt by the Dutch in 1673, and was rebuilt during the American Revolutionary War (1775–1783), though it saw no action in that conflict.

Listed buildings 

|}

See also
 Scheduled monuments in Shetland

Notes

References

External links

Shetland